The 1933 Fresno State Bulldogs football team represented Fresno State Normal School—now known as California State University, Fresno—during the 1933 college football season.

Fresno State competed in the Far Western Conference (FWC). The 1933 team was led by first-year head coach Leo Harris and played home games at Fresno State College Stadium on the campus of Fresno City College in Fresno, California. They finished the season with a record of five wins and four losses (5–4, 1–2 FWC). The Bulldogs outscored their opponents 98–71 for the season.

Schedule

Notes

References

Fresno State
Fresno State Bulldogs football seasons
Fresno State Bulldogs football